(born 24 July 1963 in Shizuoka Prefecture) is a former Japanese rugby union player. He played as a hooker.

Career
Hirose started his rugby career while attending Doshisha University, for whose rugby team he played. After his graduation, he played for Ricoh until his retirement. His first cap for Japan was against Ireland Students, in Tokyo, on 3 October 1987. He was also among the players called up by the then-national coach Katsumi Miyaji for the 1987 Rugby World Cup squad, although he never played any match in the tournament. His last cap was against the 1988 Asian Rugby Championship against South Korea, in Hong Kong, on 19 November 1988, where Japan arrived second in the championship. Hirose was also part of the Japan squad which defeated Scotland XV on 28 May 1989, but he never saw action.

Notes

External links

1963 births
Living people
People from Shizuoka Prefecture
Sportspeople from Shizuoka Prefecture
Rugby union hookers
Japanese rugby union players
Japan international rugby union players
Black Rams Tokyo players